Equestrian was contested at the 1982 Asian Games at the Harbaksh Stadium, New Delhi, India between 21 and 27 November 1982. It was the first equestrian event in Asian Games.

The host nation India topped the medal table with three gold medals. Kuwait finished second by winning all three medals of the individual jumping event.

Medalists

Medal table

References

External links 
 Results – Eventing
 Results – Jumping
 Results – Tent pegging

 
1982 Asian Games events
1982
Asian Games